Gastrana is a genus of bivalves belonging to the family Tellinidae.

The genus has almost cosmopolitan distribution.

Species:

Gastrana aquitanica 
Gastrana fragilis 
Gastrana lyngei 
Gastrana matadoa 
Gastrana multangula 
Gastrana orstomi 
Gastrana peregrina

References

Tellinidae
Bivalve genera